The Brent Group is a stratigraphic group of Middle Jurassic age. It is an important hydrocarbon reservoir in the Northern North Sea. It is named for the Brent oil field, where it forms one of the reservoir units. It is subdivided into five formations, in order of age, the Broom, Rannoch, Etive, Ness and Tarbet Formations whose first letters spell out the name of the group.

References

Geology of the North Sea